The AFC Professional Coaching Diploma, also known as the AFC Pro-Diploma, is the highest level of coaching accreditation issued by the Asian Football Confederation (AFC). The diploma was first awarded by the AFC in 2001. The AFC considers the diploma the equivalent of the UEFA Pro Licence.

Structure
Students are required to have completed the B coaching certificate. Study for the diploma involves undertaking at least 220 hours of coursework.

The AFC have proposed that coaches of all national professional leagues, AFC Champions League and AFC Cup teams must have the diploma.

References

Association football in Asia
Association football managers